Theodore Marshall (1846–1909) was a Scottish minister who served as Moderator of the General Assembly of the Church of Scotland in 1908.

Life

He was born on 8 March 1843 at 9 Fettes Row the son of John Marshall, advocate (later known as Lord Curriehill) and his wife, Margaret Tod Bell daughter of Rev Andrew Bell of Crail. He was educated at Loretto School and Edinburgh Academy, then studied at Glasgow University and Edinburgh University, graduating MA in 1864.

He was licensed to preach by the Presbytery of Wigtown in 1867 and served as assistant at St Stephen's Church in Stockbridge, Edinburgh. He was ordained as minister of Caputh in Perthshire in February 1869 under the patronage of Queen Victoria and remained there until 1893.

He then followed in the footsteps of Very Rev K. M. Phin and ran the Church of Scotland's Home Mission Service based at 22 Queen Street in Edinburgh's New Town.
He lived at Linkswood, Davidsons Mains in western Edinburgh.

He died on a train travelling from Perth to Crieff on 1 May 1909. Because he died during his tenancy as Moderator he remained styled as Right Reverend (Very Reverend being the style for former Moderators).

He is buried in Dean Cemetery in western Edinburgh. The grave lies on the north side of the central gap between the original cemetery and the first northern extension. His grave wrongly terms him Very Reverend. He is also memorialised on his parents' grave in St Cuthberts Churchyard in the city centre, where he is correctly titled Right Rev.

Family

He was married to Anne Nicholson (1846–1939) at 3 Regent Terrace, Edinburgh on 21 July 1869. She was the daughter of Rev Dr Maxwell Nicholson of St Stephen's Church in Stockbridge, Edinburgh.

Memorials

The baptismal font at Iona Abbey is dedicated to his memory.

References

1846 births
1909 deaths
People educated at Loretto School, Musselburgh
People educated at Edinburgh Academy
19th-century Ministers of the Church of Scotland
Moderators of the General Assembly of the Church of Scotland
Burials at the Dean Cemetery
20th-century Ministers of the Church of Scotland